Roger Moorhouse (born 1968) is a British historian and author.

Education
He was born in Stockport, Cheshire, England and attended Berkhamsted School and the School of Slavonic and East European Studies of the University of London, graduating with an MA in history and politics in 1994.

Whilst a student, Moorhouse worked as a researcher for Professor Norman Davies, collaborating on many of the latter's best-known publications, including Europe: A History, The Isles: A History and Rising '44 and culminating in the publication in 2002 of a co-authored study of the history of the city of Wrocław (the former German Breslau) entitled Microcosm: Portrait of a Central European City.

Main publications
In 2006, Moorhouse's first solo book, Killing Hitler, was published, which has since been translated a number of times. In a CNN news report of 3 September 2011, Killing Hitler was shown on Al-Saadi Gaddafi's desk after he had fled his office in the wake of the collapse of the Gaddafi regime in Libya. The reporter Nic Robertson suggested that Gaddafi had been reading the book prior to his flight.

His next book, Berlin at War: Life and Death in Hitler's Capital, 1939-45, is a social history of Berlin during World War II, which was published in the summer of 2010. Writing in the Financial Times, Andrew Roberts commented, "Few books on the war genuinely increase the sum of our collective knowledge of this exhaustively covered period, but this one does".  Berlin at War was listed in the books of the year for 2010 by The Daily Telegraph, and American Spectator magazine, and it was shortlisted for the Hessell-Tiltman Prize for history.

In 2014, Moorhouse's The Devils' Alliance: Hitler's Pact with Stalin, 1939-1941 was published. Despite praising the book for its "masterly" account of the signing of the Molotov–Ribbentrop Pact, the historian Richard J. Evans took exception to the book's "unbalanced treatment" of the crimes of the Soviets over those of the Nazis and asserted that "for all its virtues this is a deeply problematic book".
Other reviewers of the book were more positive: the Wall Street Journal described it as "superb" and The Daily Telegraph listed it among its Books of the Year for 2014.

Moorhouse's more recent publication, First to Fight: The Polish War 1939 (2019 in the UK, 2020 in the US, as Poland 1939), on the German-Soviet invasion of Poland in September 1939, was widely acclaimed ("fascinating" according to The Telegraph, "deeply researched, very well written . . . standard work" in the words of Andrew Roberts, "timely and authoritative" according to The Spectator), named among books of the year for 2019 by BBC History Magazine and The Daily Telegraph and shortlisted for the Duke of Wellington Medal for Military History 2020. However, praise was by no means universal. Writing in the Times Literary Supplement, Anita J. Prażmowska stated that "Moorhouse ignores the fact that Poland did conduct its own independent foreign policy during the whole of the interwar period", that "he is notably ungenerous in recognizing that we have good histories of the period" and that he "refuses to acknowledge France’s role in the crisis of September 1939".

Summary
A fluent German speaker, Moorhouse is a specialist in modern German history, particularly on Adolf Hitler and the Third Reich. In this capacity, he has written for The Times, The Independent on Sunday, and the Financial Times, and is a regular contributor to both the BBC History magazine and History Today.  Increasingly, Moorhouse is concerning himself with modern Polish history, especially of the wartime period.

Moorhouse is a regular public speaker, and has appeared, among others, at the Edinburgh International Book Festival and the Bath Literature Festival. Since 2016, he has been a visiting professor at the College of Europe in Natolin near Warsaw.  He is a Fellow of the Royal Historical Society.

Other publications
 Jak powstało Powstanie '44, Norman Davies, (Znak, Kraków, 2005), Chapter
 The Men Who Tried to Kill Hitler, Roger Manvell & Heinrich Fraenkel, (Frontline Books, 2008), Introduction
 He Was My Chief: The Memoirs of Adolf Hitler's Secretary, Christa Schroeder, (Frontline Books, 2009), Introduction
 With Hitler to the End: The Memoir of Hitler's Valet, Heinz Linge, (Frontline Books, 2009), Introduction
 The Celebrated Pedestrian and Other Historical Curiosities, (BBC History, 2009), Contributions
 I was Hitler's Chauffeur: The Memoirs of Erich Kempka, Erich Kempka, (Frontline Books, 2010), Introduction
 The Hitler I Knew, Otto Dietrich, (Skyhorse Publishing, 2010), Introduction
 The Hand of History: An Anthology of Quotes and Commentaries, Michael Leventhal (ed.), (Frontline Books, 2011), Contribution
 While Berlin Burns, Hans-Georg von Studnitz, (Pen & Sword Books, 2012), Introduction
 The Sniper Anthology, Martin Pegler (Ed.), (Frontline Books, 2012), Chapter on Simo Häyhä
 Hitler was My Friend: The Memoirs of Hitler's Photographer, Heinrich Hoffmann, (Frontline Books, 2012), Introduction
Ship of Fate: The Story of the MV Wilhelm Gustloff (2016)
 The Third Reich in 100 Objects, (Greenhill Books, 2017)

Awards and honours
 Shortlisted for the Hessell-Tiltman Prize for history for Berlin at War (2010).
 Shortlisted for the Duke of Wellington Medal for Military History 2020 for First to Fight (2019).
 Shortlisted for the British Army Military Book of the Year 2020 for First to Fight (2019).
 Awarded the Knight's Cross of the Order of Merit of the Republic of Poland (2020).
 Winner of the Polish Foreign Ministry History Prize for First to Fight (2019).

Personal life
Moorhouse is married with two children and lives in Tring, Hertfordshire.

References

External links

Official site

1968 births
Living people
British historians
Historians of Nazism
British writers
Alumni of the UCL School of Slavonic and East European Studies
People from Stockport
Knights of the Order of Merit of the Republic of Poland